Hoseynabad-e Rekhneh Gol (also Romanized as Ḩoseynābād-e Rekhneh Gol; also known as Ḩoseynābād-e Rekhneh and Rekhneh) is a village in Qalandarabad Rural District, Qalandarabad District, Fariman County, Razavi Khorasan Province, Iran. At the 2006 census, its population was 1,296, in 286 families.

References 

Populated places in Fariman County